Film Propaganda in Britain and Nazi Germany: World War II Cinema is a 2007 book written by Jo Fox.

References 

History books about World War II
2007 non-fiction books
.
.